Ghananand (born 1673 AD - died  1760 AD) was the leading poet of the last poetry of three major poems of Ritikal - Ritit, Ritisiddha and Ritmukat. These four poems are also popular with name 'Anandaghan'. Acharya Ramchandra Shukla has estimated time of composition of Ritmukat poem at  1746 . According to Shukla, he was killed at the time of Nadir shah's invasion.

Life 
His birthplace and father's name are unknown. He was a kayastha.He spent his early life around Delhi and later in Vrindavan He had interest in both literature and music. 

It is said that he was a Mirmunshi in the court of Shahshah Muhammad Shah Rungile.
Hindi-language literature
Indian poets
Hindi-language poets

References